Arne Myhrvold (born 12 June 1945) is a Norwegian sports official. He was president of the Norwegian Olympic Committee from 1989, of the Norwegian Confederation of Sports from 1994, and of the Norwegian Olympic and Paralympic Committee and Confederation of Sports after the merge, from 1996 to 1999. He served as sports director in the umbrella organization of European Olympic Committees from 1999 to 2002.

References

1945 births
Living people
Norwegian sports executives and administrators